Gonomyia is a genus of crane fly in the family Limoniidae.

Species
Subgenus Gonomyia Meigen, 1818

G. abscondita Lackschewitz, 1935
G. abyssa Alexander, 1946
G. aequalis Alexander, 1916
G. affinis Brunetti, 1912
G. aitkeniana Alexander, 1979
G. andicola Alexander, 1913
G. anduzei Alexander, 1940
G. animula Alexander, 1966
G. anserina Alexander, 1943
G. appendiculata Alexander, 1943
G. aspera Alexander, 1943
G. aymara Alexander, 1962
G. basilobata Alexander, 1975
G. basispina Alexander, 1979
G. bibarbata Alexander, 1935
G. bidentata Alexander, 1922
G. bifida Tonnoir, 1920
G. bifurcifer Alexander, 1939
G. bifurcula Alexander, 1946
G. bihamata Alexander, 1943
G. birama Alexander, 1941
G. brachyura Alexander, 1963
G. brevicula Alexander, 1926
G. brevissima Alexander, 1926
G. bryanti Alexander, 1915
G. callisto Alexander, 1956
G. catamarcae Alexander, 1929
G. chalaza Alexander, 1957
G. chiapasensis Alexander, 1927
G. colei Alexander, 1966
G. connivens Alexander, 1946
G. conoviensis Barnes, 1924
G. copulata (Becker, 1908)
G. crinita Alexander, 1941
G. currani Alexander, 1926
G. curvispina Podenas & Gelhaus, 2001
G. dasyphallus Alexander, 1949
G. debilis Alexander, 1928
G. decacantha Alexander, 1957
G. delicata Alexander, 1913
G. dentata de Meijere, 1920
G. dissidens Alexander, 1957
G. dominicana Alexander, 1970
G. dyas Alexander, 1957
G. efficiens Alexander, 1943
G. emphysema Alexander, 1962
G. ericarum Alexander, 1956
G. expansa Alexander, 1938
G. extensivena Alexander, 1943
G. faria Stary & Freidberg, 2007
G. filicauda Alexander, 1916
G. filiformis Alexander, 1948
G. flavibasis Alexander, 1916
G. foliacea Alexander, 1935
G. fulvipennis Alexander, 1968
G. furcula Alexander, 1962
G. gemula Alexander, 1946
G. gilvipennis Alexander, 1928
G. gnophosoma Alexander, 1956
G. gratilla Alexander, 1934
G. guerreroensis Alexander, 1940
G. hamulata Edwards, 1933
G. harmstoni Alexander, 1948
G. herroni Alexander, 1948
G. hippocampi Stubbs & Geiger, 1993
G. hirsutistyla Alexander, 1963
G. hyperacuta Alexander, 1956
G. idiostyla Alexander, 1970
G. illicis Alexander, 1921
G. impacata Alexander, 1957
G. ingrica Lackschewitz, 1964
G. irianensis Alexander, 1964
G. ishana Alexander, 1961
G. isolata Alexander, 1949
G. jamaicana Alexander, 1964
G. jejuna Alexander, 1916
G. juarezi Alexander, 1946
G. justa Alexander, 1935
G. justifica Alexander, 1936
G. kurokawae Alexander, 1957
G. latifolia Alexander, 1935
G. latilobata Alexander, 1934
G. lobulata Savchenko, 1980
G. longifimbriata Alexander, 1934
G. lucidula de Meijere, 1920
G. luteipleura Alexander, 1936
G. mainensis Alexander, 1919
G. malitia Alexander, 1973
G. marini Erhan, 1985
G. matileana Alexander, 1979
G. matsya Alexander, 1955
G. megarhopala Alexander, 1946
G. mendica Alexander, 1956
G. methodica Alexander, 1931
G. mexicana Alexander, 1916
G. microserrata Alexander, 1938
G. mimetica Alexander, 1921
G. modica Savchenko, 1972
G. multiacuta Alexander, 1963
G. multispicata Alexander, 1938
G. nansei Alexander, 1930
G. napoensis Alexander, 1979
G. nebulicola Alexander, 1932
G. necopina Alexander, 1957
G. nigrotuberculata Savchenko, 1986
G. nubeculosa de Meijere, 1911
G. obscuriclava Alexander, 1934
G. octospinosa Alexander, 1936
G. odontostyla Savchenko, 1972
G. omeiensis Alexander, 1930
G. omogoensis Alexander, 1955
G. ostentator Alexander, 1946
G. otiosa Alexander, 1949
G. oxybeles Alexander, 1979
G. paiuta Alexander, 1948
G. papposa Savchenko, 1983
G. parvicellula (Brunetti, 1918)
G. parvistyla Alexander, 1979
G. pauaiensis Alexander, 1934
G. pauliana Nielsen, 1966
G. pensilis Alexander, 1957
G. percomplexa Alexander, 1946
G. periploca Alexander, 1963
G. pilosistyla Alexander & Alexander, 1973
G. platymerina Alexander, 1944
G. platymeroides Alexander, 1952
G. poliocephala Alexander, 1924
G. principalis Alexander, 1938
G. quaesita Alexander, 1938
G. queribunda Alexander, 1941
G. ravana Alexander, 1962
G. recta Tonnoir, 1920
G. rectangular Alexander, 1966
G. remigera Alexander, 1946
G. remota Alexander, 1926
G. resoluta Alexander, 1950
G. rhicnacantha Alexander, 1957
G. salmani Alexander, 1927
G. sejuncta Alexander, 1970
G. sekiana Alexander, 1934
G. serendibensis Alexander, 1958
G. serpentigera Savchenko, 1983
G. serpentina Alexander, 1938
G. sexlobata Savchenko, 1978
G. sibyna Alexander, 1962
G. sicula Lackschewitz, 1940
G. simplex Tonnoir, 1920
G. sparsisetosa Alexander, 1960
G. spiculistyla Alexander, 1950
G. spinifer Alexander, 1918
G. spinula Savchenko, 1983
G. stackelbergi Lackschewitz, 1935
G. stellata Alexander, 1946
G. stenorhabda Alexander, 1969
G. stylacantha Alexander, 1969
G. subaffinis Alexander, 1968
G. subappendiculata Alexander, 1954
G. subbrevicula Alexander, 1947
G. subcinerea Osten Sacken, 1860
G. subremota Alexander, 1938
G. subtenella Savchenko, 1972
G. subunicolor Alexander, 1948
G. superba Alexander, 1913
G. symmetrica Edwards, 1926
G. syrraxis Alexander, 1955
G. taeniata Alexander, 1927
G. tanaocantha Alexander, 1963
G. tenella (Meigen, 1818)
G. teucheres Alexander, 1957
G. theowaldi Stary, 1982
G. triaculeata Alexander, 1938
G. triformis Alexander, 1946
G. tristylata Savchenko, 1983
G. turritella Alexander, 1959
G. unicolor Alexander, 1913
G. unispicata Alexander, 1956
G. vafra Alexander, 1945
G. vana Savchenko, 1980
G. varipes Alexander, 1914
G. versicolor Alexander, 1934
G. virgata Doane, 1900
G. wygodzinskyi Alexander, 1962
G. yama Alexander, 1962

Subgenus Gonomyina Alexander, 1946
G. durabilis Alexander, 1946
G. parishi (Alexander, 1913)
G. persimilis (Alexander, 1920)
G. runa Alexander, 1947
Subgenus Idiocerodes Savchenko, 1972
G. aperta Brunetti, 1912
G. armigera Alexander, 1922
G. cognatella Osten Sacken, 1860
G. concinna Lackschewitz, 1940
G. diabarica Savchenko, 1972
G. florens Alexander, 1916
G. kansensis Alexander, 1918
G. pleurolineola Alexander, 1957
G. reflexa Alexander, 1927
G. subaperta Alexander, 1957
G. subcognatella Alexander, 1932
Subgenus Leiponeura Skuse, 1890

G. acanthomelana Alexander, 1970
G. acanthophallus Alexander, 1931
G. acus Alexander, 1936
G. acuspinosa Alexander, 1934
G. adamsoni Alexander, 1932
G. adunca Alexander, 1921
G. aegina Alexander, 1948
G. alboannulata Alexander, 1931
G. ambiens Alexander, 1950
G. amblystyla Alexander, 1968
G. anduzeana Alexander, 1941
G. angulifera Alexander, 1933
G. anxia Alexander, 1934
G. apiculata Alexander, 1960
G. aquila Alexander, 1934
G. arajuno Alexander, 1946
G. atrox Alexander, 1937
G. auchetes Alexander, 1962
G. austrotropica Theischinger, 1999
G. baiame Theischinger, 1994
G. banksiana Alexander, 1924
G. basicuspis Alexander, 1948
G. basispinosa Alexander, 1937
G. basistylata Alexander, 1979
G. bata Alexander, 1975
G. batesi Alexander, 1945
G. biaculeata Alexander, 1938
G. bibula (Wiedemann, 1828)
G. bicircularis Alexander, 1962
G. bicolorata Alexander, 1930
G. bicornuta Alexander, 1927
G. biensis Alexander, 1978
G. bifiligera Alexander, 1933
G. bigeminata Alexander, 1962
G. bilobata Alexander, 1960
G. bimucronata Alexander, 1941
G. biserpentigera Alexander, 1948
G. bispina Alexander, 1924
G. bispinosa Alexander, 1921
G. boki Alexander, 1976
G. borburatana Alexander, 1941
G. bougainvilleae Alexander, 1950
G. brachyglossa Alexander, 1948
G. brevivena (Skuse, 1890)
G. bruchi Alexander, 1920
G. burgessi Alexander, 1944
G. cairnensis Alexander, 1920
G. calverti Alexander, 1914
G. calyce Alexander, 1956
G. cantareirae Alexander, 1945
G. capnitis Alexander, 1948
G. carrerai Alexander, 1943
G. carsiostyla Alexander, 1971
G. cervaria Alexander, 1938
G. circumcincta Alexander, 1924
G. citribasis Alexander, 1948
G. clavifera Alexander, 1943
G. complicata Alexander, 1979
G. conjugens Senior-White, 1922
G. conquisita Alexander, 1936
G. cooloola Theischinger, 1994
G. crepuscula Alexander, 1921
G. cryophila Alexander, 1961
G. ctenophora Alexander, 1921
G. cubana Alexander, 1931
G. cultrata Alexander, 1941
G. curvistyla Alexander, 1961
G. curvistylata Alexander, 1981
G. degeneri Alexander, 1956
G. diacantha Alexander, 1934
G. diacanthophora Alexander, 1941
G. diffusa (de Meijere, 1911)
G. digitifera Alexander, 1924
G. dipterophora Alexander, 1948
G. dischidia Alexander, 1978
G. discreta Alexander, 1932
G. dispar Alexander, 1962
G. dissimilis Alexander, 1961
G. distenta Alexander, 1953
G. dosis Alexander, 1955
G. dotata Alexander, 1945
G. duurvoorti Alexander, 1929
G. edo Alexander, 1976
G. ekiti Alexander, 1974
G. elachistos Alexander, 1956
G. esakiella Alexander, 1940
G. extensa Alexander, 1914
G. fijiensis Alexander, 1914
G. fimbriata Alexander, 1959
G. flavidapex Edwards, 1927
G. flavocostalis Alexander, 1924
G. flavomarginata Brunetti, 1912
G. flavonotata (Edwards, 1912)
G. fortibasis Alexander, 1967
G. furcilla Alexander, 1953
G. furcillata Alexander, 1956
G. fuscofemorata Alexander, 1961
G. fuscohalterata Alexander, 1926
G. fuscoscutellata Alexander, 1933
G. gillottae Alexander, 1929
G. gressitti Alexander, 1935
G. gressittiana Alexander, 1972
G. hackeri Edwards, 1928
G. haploa Alexander, 1926
G. haploides Alexander, 1938
G. hawaiiensis Alexander, 1919
G. hedys Alexander, 1958
G. helotos Alexander, 1971
G. hestica Alexander, 1968
G. hodgkini Alexander, 1950
G. hoffmaniana Alexander, 1947
G. horrifica Alexander, 1938
G. houtensis Alexander, 1964
G. hyperion Alexander, 1956
G. ibo Alexander, 1974
G. impedita Alexander, 1946
G. inaequistyla Alexander, 1934
G. incompleta Brunetti, 1912
G. inermis Alexander, 1914
G. inquisita Alexander, 1937
G. insolita Alexander, 1979
G. intrepida Alexander, 1940
G. ischyria Alexander, 1948
G. iyala Alexander, 1976
G. jacobsoniana Alexander, 1934
G. juquiana Alexander, 1945
G. jurata Alexander, 1936
G. kama Alexander, 1963
G. kamballa Theischinger, 1994
G. katangae Alexander, 1937
G. kertesziana Alexander, 1934
G. kiandra Theischinger, 1994
G. kraussi Alexander, 1956
G. lamellaris (Speiser, 1913)
G. lanka Alexander, 1958
G. leonura Alexander, 1941
G. leucomelania Alexander, 1931
G. liberiensis Alexander, 1930
G. longiradialis Alexander, 1930
G. longispina Alexander, 1922
G. ludibunda Alexander, 1926
G. lustralis Alexander, 1945
G. luteimarginata Alexander, 1931
G. lyra Alexander, 1935
G. macilenta Alexander, 1932
G. macintyrei Alexander, 1937
G. macswaini Alexander, 1940
G. mambila Alexander, 1975
G. manca Osten Sacken, 1869
G. maquilingia Alexander, 1931
G. marquesana Alexander, 1932
G. mascarena Alexander, 1921
G. mashona Alexander, 1959
G. maya Alexander, 1927
G. mecophallus Alexander, 1966
G. medleri Alexander, 1972
G. melanacantha Alexander, 1954
G. melanorhyncha Savchenko, 1987
G. melanostyla Alexander, 1962
G. mesoneura Alexander, 1931
G. metallescens Edwards, 1927
G. milangensis Alexander, 1960
G. minutistyla Alexander, 1969
G. misera Alexander, 1921
G. mitophora Alexander, 1935
G. mizoensis Alexander, 1963
G. molokaiensis Hardy, 1953
G. moma Theischinger, 1994
G. monura Alexander, 1961
G. mumfordi Alexander, 1932
G. mundewudda Theischinger, 1994
G. mythica Alexander, 1945
G. naiadifera Edwards, 1927
G. narasinha Alexander, 1955
G. nebulosa (de Meijere, 1911)
G. neonebulosa Alexander, 1930
G. nestor Alexander, 1947
G. nexosa Alexander, 1958
G. nigridorsata Alexander, 1936
G. nigrohalterata Edwards, 1923
G. nilgiriensis Alexander, 1964
G. nissoriana Alexander, 1936
G. noctabunda Alexander, 1920
G. novocaledoniae Alexander, 1945
G. nyasae Alexander, 1920
G. ocypete Alexander, 1948
G. oliveri Alexander, 1924
G. onya Theischinger, 1994
G. oolyarra Theischinger, 1994
G. ophion Alexander, 1948
G. ornatipes (Brunetti, 1912)
G. orthomera Alexander, 1937
G. orthomeroides Alexander, 1939
G. pachymera Alexander, 1975
G. pacifica Edwards, 1928
G. pallicostata Alexander, 1936
G. pallidisignata Alexander, 1931
G. pararamifera Alexander, 1960
G. parinermis Alexander, 1940
G. parvispinosa Alexander, 1938
G. pedica Alexander, 1947
G. pentacantha Alexander, 1967
G. perattenuata Alexander, 1976
G. perpicta Alexander, 1948
G. perreducta Alexander, 1934
G. perscabrosa Alexander, 1961
G. perssoni Alexander, 1978
G. pervilis Alexander, 1935
G. petronis Alexander, 1942
G. philomela Alexander, 1945
G. phoracantha Alexander, 1938
G. phoroctenia Alexander, 1921
G. pietatis Alexander, 1940
G. pilifera (de Meijere, 1911)
G. pilosispina Alexander, 1937
G. pinivagata Alexander, 1934
G. pino Theischinger, 1994
G. piscator Theischinger, 1999
G. platyphallus Alexander, 1971
G. pleurostriata Alexander, 1936
G. pontifex Alexander, 1953
G. porrecta Alexander, 1978
G. praedita Alexander, 1935
G. pratapi Alexander, 1958
G. producta Alexander, 1919
G. projecta Alexander, 1941
G. prolixistylus Alexander, 1930
G. prolongata Alexander, 1940
G. protenta Alexander, 1978
G. puckowe Theischinger, 1994
G. puella (Williston, 1896)
G. puer Alexander, 1913
G. pulchripes Alexander, 1921
G. pulvinifera Alexander, 1936
G. punctigera Alexander, 1933
G. pusilla (Lackschewitz, 1964)
G. pyensoni Alexander, 1939
G. quadrifila Alexander, 1930
G. quadrifilaris Alexander, 1960
G. queenslandica Alexander, 1920
G. ramifera Alexander, 1934
G. ramus Alexander, 1943
G. rastriformis Alexander, 1946
G. reclinata Alexander, 1962
G. recurvata Alexander, 1914
G. recurvispina Alexander, 1948
G. reyesi Alexander, 1946
G. rhadinostyla Alexander, 1964
G. robinsoni Edwards, 1928
G. rogeziana Alexander, 1953
G. sacandaga Alexander, 1914
G. sagittifera Alexander, 1932
G. sana Alexander, 1936
G. sandersi Alexander, 1931
G. saudiarabiensis Hancock, 1997
G. sauteri Alexander, 1930
G. scelerata Alexander, 1945
G. scimitar Alexander, 1914
G. scythra Alexander, 1960
G. secespita Alexander, 1937
G. secreta Alexander, 1931
G. senaria Alexander, 1943
G. siculifera Alexander, 1961
G. silinda Alexander, 1957
G. sinuosa Alexander, 1930
G. sircari Alexander, 1936
G. skusei Alexander, 1919
G. sobrina Alexander, 1920
G. sparsipuncta Alexander, 1948
G. speratina Alexander, 1968
G. spicata Alexander, 1921
G. spiniterga Alexander, 1948
G. spinolateralis Alexander, 1971
G. subacus Alexander, 1962
G. subaegina Alexander, 1962
G. subanxia Alexander, 1937
G. subinermis Alexander, 1939
G. sublustralis Alexander, 1967
G. subnebulosa Edwards, 1928
G. subpilifera Alexander, 1934
G. subramifera Alexander, 1960
G. subscimitar Alexander, 1946
G. subterminalis Alexander, 1927
G. subtribulator Alexander, 1943
G. subtroilus Alexander, 1967
G. sulphurella Osten Sacken, 1860
G. supplicata Alexander, 1965
G. tafiensis Alexander, 1962
G. tahitiensis Alexander, 1933
G. tatei Alexander, 1960
G. tenuipollex Alexander, 1948
G. tenuistylus Alexander, 1926
G. tergofimbriata Alexander, 1929
G. tergospinosa Alexander, 1975
G. terraereginae Alexander, 1921
G. tersa Alexander, 1949
G. tetrastyla Alexander, 1950
G. thambaroo Theischinger, 1994
G. threnodes Alexander, 1956
G. toala Alexander, 1935
G. tonnoirella Alexander, 1933
G. toraja Alexander, 1935
G. trepida Alexander, 1962
G. tribulator Alexander, 1942
G. trionyx Alexander, 1949
G. tristigmata Alexander, 1932
G. tristyla Alexander, 1958
G. troilus Alexander, 1949
G. unicornuta Alexander, 1956
G. usherae Alexander, 1960
G. vanuana Alexander, 1956
G. varsha Alexander, 1963
G. vehemens Alexander, 1949
G. victorina Alexander, 1956
G. vindex Alexander, 1941
G. walkeri Theischinger, 1996
G. walshae Alexander, 1934
G. wunda Theischinger, 1994
G. xanthophleps Alexander, 1962
G. yapensis Alexander, 1972
G. yemenensis Hancock, 2006
G. zimmermani Alexander, 1956

Subgenus Megalipophleps Alexander, 1971
G. dicranura Edwards, 1928
G. labidura Edwards, 1928
G. nigripennis Edwards, 1928
Subgenus Neolipophleps Alexander, 1947
G. acuminata Alexander, 1921
G. aequidens Alexander, 1938
G. aequispinosa Alexander, 1926
G. alexanderi (Johnson, 1912)
G. cinerea (Doane, 1900)
G. condensa Alexander, 1938
G. extenuata Alexander, 1945
G. falcifer Alexander, 1921
G. glabrispina Alexander, 1926
G. helophila Alexander, 1916
G. machaeria Alexander, 1921
G. monacantha Alexander, 1937
G. neofalcifer Alexander, 1943
G. platymera Alexander, 1939
G. schadeana Alexander, 1935
G. strigilis Alexander, 1926
G. subfalcifer Alexander, 1922
G. topoensis Alexander, 1952
G. trispinosa Alexander, 1921
Subgenus Paralipophleps Alexander, 1947
G. aitkeni Alexander, 1971
G. amazona Alexander, 1912
G. cultriformis Alexander, 1970
G. dikopis Alexander, 1970
G. diplacantha Alexander, 1967
G. gladiator Alexander, 1919
G. guayaquilensis Alexander, 1938
G. heteromera Alexander, 1942
G. indotata Alexander, 1966
G. latistyla Alexander, 1926
G. lemniscata Alexander, 1931
G. micracantha Alexander, 1926
G. micromera Alexander, 1945
G. neobifida Alexander, 1953
G. peracuta Alexander, 1928
G. pleuralis (Williston, 1896)
G. spinistyla Alexander, 1926
G. uncinata Alexander, 1969
G. wirthiana Alexander, 1970
Subgenus Prolipophleps Savchenko, 1972
G. abbreviata Loew, 1873
G. brachiostyla Savchenko, 1972
G. divergens Bangerter, 1947
G. elimata Alexander, 1957
G. funesta Alexander, 1936
G. gracilistylus Alexander, 1924
G. reducta Bangerter, 1947
Subgenus Teuchogonomyia Alexander, 1968
G. aciculifera Alexander, 1919
G. curvistyla Savchenko, 1982
G. edwardsi Lackschewitz, 1925
G. horribilis Alexander, 1941
G. ithyphallus Lackschewitz, 1935
G. noveboracensis Alexander, 1916
G. quadrilobata Savchenko, 1983
G. sevierensis Alexander, 1948
G. tetonensis Alexander, 1946

References

Limoniidae
Nematocera genera